David G. Taylor (July 29, 1929 – February 23, 2009) was chairman of Continental Illinois National Bank and Trust Company in early 1984. He successfully negotiated with the Treasury Department for it to arrange a $7.5 billion rescue package for the bank.

References 

1929 births
2009 deaths

20th-century American businesspeople